Joseph K.N. Waku  was elected Senator for the Benue North West constituency of Benue State, Nigeria at the start of the Nigerian Fourth Republic, running on the People's Democratic Party (PDP) platform. He took office on 29 May 1999.
After taking his seat in the Senate in June 1999 he was appointed to committees on Senate Services, Works & Housing, Health, Establishment, Water Resources (Chairman) and Privatization.

After leaving office, Waku became active in the Arewa Consultative Forum (ACF), a northern lobbying group.
In a December 2003 interview he said that the Middle Belt Forum was deliberately excluding non-Christians from their organization, and explained that the ACF was formed to give a voice to northern minorities including those in the Middle Belt.
Speaking as Vice Chairman in June 2008, he accused Senate President David Mark of ethnic prejudice in opposing the appointment of Farida Waziri, a Tiv, as head of the Economic and Financial Crimes Commission.

References

Living people
People from Benue State
Peoples Democratic Party members of the Senate (Nigeria)
20th-century Nigerian politicians
21st-century Nigerian politicians
Year of birth missing (living people)